Crazy Tour was the seventh concert tour by the British rock band Queen during November and December 1979.

Background
After the release of the single "Crazy Little Thing Called Love", the band decided to change the concert format they do in the previous tours, as a result, they revisited smaller venues and adopted a new intro tape, consisting of a droning synthesizer leading into the thunder and lightning heard at the end of Dead On Time, from the previous tour. Initially scheduled to end on 22 December after the concert at the Alexandra Palace, the last concert of this tour at the Hammersmith Odeon, was also the first concert of the Concerts for the People of Kampuchea. A bootleg recording of this concert exists as the 2-CD set Crazy Tour of London.

Due to the band choosing to visit many smaller venues during this tour, their lighting rig was scaled down. Additionally, many other changes were made to the band's presentation. Namely, Freddie Mercury decided not to wear suspenders and instead chose to wear a red tie, and either black pants with red kneepads or red pants with blue kneepads. Roger Taylor also adopted a new bass drum head, which was an edited image of his face. It would remain this way through the European Hot Space Tour of 1982. It is also worth noting that this is the final tour before Freddie grew his trademark moustache in 1980.

This is the first tour where Mercury played guitar on the track "Crazy Little Thing Called Love", in which he play a 12-string Ovation Pacemaker. Brian May would also play piano on this tour for the track "Save Me", after having made his debut on the instrument several months ago on the Japanese leg of the Jazz Tour, with the track "Teo Torriatte". "Liar" was placed on rotation during this tour after a nearly two year absence.

Setlists

Tour dates

Tour band
Freddie Mercury: Lead vocals, piano, guitar ("Crazy Little Thing Called Love"), tambourine.
Brian May: Guitar, backing vocals, piano.
Roger Taylor: Drums, timpani, lead vocals ("I'm in Love With My Car"), backing vocals.
John Deacon: Bass guitar, additional vocals

References

Sources

External links
Queen Concerts

Queen (band) concert tours
1979 concert tours